The Naich (Urdu: , Hindi: नाइच) is a Jat tribe settled throughout the Sindh, Khyber Pakhtunkhwa and Punjab provinces of Pakistan.

References

Sindhi tribes
Punjabi tribes
Jat tribes
Jat clans
Jat